Mark Evans (born 24 August 1970) is an English former professional footballer who played as a goalkeeper.

Career
Born in Leeds, Evans played for Bradford City and Scarborough, making a total of 24 appearances in the Football League.

References

1970 births
Living people
English footballers
Bradford City A.F.C. players
Scarborough F.C. players
English Football League players
Association football goalkeepers